Thomas Brackin (5 January 1859 – 7 October 1924) was an English first-class cricketer, who played three matches for Yorkshire County Cricket Club in 1882.

Born in Thornes Common, Wakefield, Yorkshire, England, Brackin was a right-handed batsman, he scored 12 runs at an average of 2.00 per innings, with a best score of nine against Nottinghamshire.  His right arm slow bowling was not called upon.

Brackin died aged 65, in October 1924, in Darton, Yorkshire.

References

External links
Cricinfo Profile

Yorkshire cricketers
Cricketers from Wakefield
1859 births
1924 deaths
English cricketers
English cricketers of 1864 to 1889